Grays Harbor County is a county in the U.S. state of Washington. As of the 2020 census, the population was 75,636. Its county seat is Montesano, and its largest city is Aberdeen. Grays Harbor County is included in the Aberdeen Micropolitan Statistical Area.

History
The county is presently named after a large estuarine bay near its southwestern corner. On May 7, 1792, Boston fur trader Robert Gray crossed the bar into a bay which he called Bullfinch Harbor, but which later cartographers would label Chehalis Bay, and then Grays Harbor.

The area that now comprises Grays Harbor County was part of Oregon Territory in the first part of the nineteenth century. On December 19, 1845, the Provisional Government of Oregon created two counties (Vancouver and Clark) in its northern portion (which is now the state of Washington). In 1849, the name of Vancouver County was changed to Lewis County, and on April 14, 1854, a portion of Lewis County was partitioned off to become Chehalis County. This county's boundaries have not changed since its creation, but on June 9, 1915, its name was changed to Grays Harbor County to eliminate confusion with the town of Chehalis in Lewis County.

Geography

Geographic features

State parks
Griffiths-Priday State Park
Lake Sylvia State Park
Ocean City State Park
Pacific Beach State Park
Twin Harbors State Park
Westhaven State Park (now part of Westport Light State Park)
Westport Light State Park

Major highways
 State Route 8
 U.S. Route 12
 U.S. Route 101
State Route 105
State Route 107
State Route 109

Adjacent counties
Jefferson County – north
Mason County – northeast
Thurston County – east/southeast
Lewis County – south/southeast
Pacific County – south

National protected areas
Chehalis Indian Reservation
Colonel Bob Wilderness
Copalis National Wildlife Refuge
Grays Harbor National Wildlife Refuge
Olympic National Forest (part)
Olympic National Park (part)
Quinault Indian Reservation

Demographics

2000 census
As of the census of 2000, there were 67,194 people, 26,808 households, and 17,907 families living in the county. The population density was 35 people per square mile (14/km2). There were 32,489 housing units at an average density of 17 per square mile (7/km2). The racial makeup of the county was 88.30% White, 0.34% Black or African American, 4.66% Native American, 1.22% Asian, 0.11% Pacific Islander, 2.27% from other races, and 3.10% from two or more races. 4.85% of the population were Hispanic or Latino of any race. 16.3% were of German, 11.9% United States or American, 9.9% English, 9.2% Irish, and 6.1% Norwegian ancestry. 94.1% spoke English and 3.9% Spanish as their first language.

There were 26,808 households, out of which 30.50% had children under the age of 18 living with them, 50.70% were married couples living together, 11.10% had a female householder with no husband present, and 33.20% were non-families. 26.70% of all households were made up of individuals, and 11.60% had someone living alone who was 65 years of age or older. The average household size was 2.48 and the average family size was 2.98.

In the county, the population was spread out, with 25.70% under the age of 18, 7.90% from 18 to 24, 26.00% from 25 to 44, 25.00% from 45 to 64, and 15.40% who were 65 years of age or older. The median age was 39 years. For every 100 females there were 98.80 males. For every 100 females age 18 and over, there were 96.20 males.

The median income for a household in the county was $34,160, and the median income for a family was $39,709. Males had a median income of $35,947 versus $24,262 for females. The per capita income for the county was $16,799. 16.10% of the population and 11.90% of families were below the poverty line, including 21.60% of those under the age of 18 and 40% of those 65 and older.

2010 census
As of the 2010 Census, there were 72,797 people, 28,579 households, and 18,493 families living in the county. The racial makeup of the county was 84.9% white, 4.6% American Indian, 1.4% Asian, 1.1% black or African American, 0.3% Pacific islander, 3.9% from other races, and 3.9% from two or more races. Those of Hispanic or Latino origin made up 8.6% of the population. In terms of ancestry, 21.0% were German, 13.5% were Irish, 11.7% were English, 6.8% were Norwegian, and 4.2% were American.

Of the 28,579 households, 28.8% had children under the age of 18 living with them, 46.8% were married couples living together, 11.9% had a female householder with no husband present, 35.3% were non-families, and 27.6% of all households were made up of individuals. The average household size was 2.45 and the average family size was 2.94. The median age was 41.9 years.

The median income for a household in the county was $41,899 and the median income for a family was $49,745. Males had a median income of $42,998 versus $34,183 for females. The per capita income for the county was $21,656. About 11.7% of families and 16.1% of the population were below the poverty line, including 23.1% of those under age 18 and 7.9% of those age 65 or over.

Politics
Grays Harbor used to be one of the most consistently Democratic counties in the nation. Until 2016, the last Republican presidential candidate to carry the county was Herbert Hoover in 1928; the last Republican gubernatorial candidate to win the county until 2016 was Daniel J. Evans in 1964. However, Donald Trump carried the county in the 2016 presidential election and went on to win a majority of its votes four years later.

In the United States House of Representatives Grays Harbor is part of Washington's 6th congressional district, which has a Cook Partisan Voting Index of D+5 and is represented by Derek Kilmer. In the Washington State Legislature it lies in the 19th and 24th districts. In the Washington State Senate it is represented by Kevin Van De Wege (D) and Jeff Wilson (R). In the Washington House of Representatives it is represented by Mike Chapman (D), Joel McEntire (R), Steve Tharinger (D), and Jim Walsh (R).

Economy
Principal economic activities in Grays Harbor County include wood and paper production, food processing (especially seafood), and manufacturing.

Communities

Cities

Aberdeen
Cosmopolis
Elma
Hoquiam
McCleary
Montesano (county seat)
Oakville
Ocean Shores
Westport

Census-designated places

Aberdeen Gardens
Amanda Park
Brady
Central Park
Chehalis Village (former)
Cohassett Beach
Copalis Beach
Grayland
Hogans Corner
Humptulips
Junction City
Malone
Markham
Moclips
Neilton
Ocean City
Oyehut
Pacific Beach
Porter
Queets (part)
Qui-nai-elt Village
Santiago
Satsop
Taholah

Other unincorporated communities

Artic
Alder Grove
Bay City
Carlisle
Copalis Crossing
Deckerville
Garden City
Gray Gables
Grays Harbor City
Heather
Melbourne
New London
Newton
Nisson
Ocosta
Quinault
Saginaw
South Elma
South Montesano

Notable people
Robert Arthur, actor
Elton Bennett, artist
Adam Bighill, CFL player
Gail Brown, actress
Trisha Brown, choreographer
Mark Bruener, NFL player
Daniel Bryan, professional wrestler
Robert Eugene Bush, Medal of Honor recipient
Kurt Cobain, musician
Colin Cowherd, ESPN Radio host (The Herd with Colin Cowherd)
Dale Crover, musician
Reuben H. Fleet, aviation pioneer
Clarence Chesterfield Howerton, circus performer
Jerry Lambert, actor
Robert Motherwell, artist
Peter Norton, software developer (Norton Utilities)
Krist Novoselic, musician
Buzz Osborne, musician
Douglas Osheroff, Nobel-winning physicist
Blanche Pennick, Washington State legislator
Patrick Simmons, musician
Kurdt Vanderhoof, musician

See also
Port of Grays Harbor
National Register of Historic Places listings in Grays Harbor County, Washington

Further reading
 From the book "thirty years ago ... Destructive Development began ... greed for wealth ... denuded acres ... logged-off land ... found to be fertile ... capable of the highest state of cultivation ... fishing profit ... splendid landlocked body of water ... fir ... perfect lumber ... lumber and shingle mills ... Clams, crabs and shrimp ... abundant ... an agreeable climate ... dairy industry ... unbounded ... few soils are superior to those here ... unlimited opportunity ... berry orchards ... poultry leading place ...

References

External links
 Official website
 Harborpedia
 Maritime Heritage Network, an online directory of maritime history resources in the Pacific Northwest, including the Grays Harbor cities of Aberdeen and Hoquiam.

 
1854 establishments in Washington Territory
Populated places established in 1854
Western Washington